The 2014 season was Sanfrecce Hiroshima's sixth consecutive season in J.League Division 1, and 44th overall in the Japanese top flight. Sanfrecce Hiroshima also competed in the Emperor's Cup, J.League Cup, Japanese Super Cup, and the AFC Champions League.

Transfers

In

Out

Players

First Team squad
Updated 18 March 2016

Competitions

Overview

{| class="wikitable" style="text-align: center"
|-
!rowspan=2|Competition
!colspan=8|Record
|-
!
!
!
!
!
!
!
!
|-
| J1 League

|-
| Emperor's Cup

|-
| J.League Cup

|-
| Japanese Super Cup

|-
| AFC Champions League

|-
! Total

Japanese Super Cup

J1 League

Emperor's Cup

J.League Cup

Quarter-finals

Semi-finals

Final

AFC Champions League

Sanfrecce Hiroshima have qualified for the Group Stage of the 2014 AFC Champions League by winning the 2013 J.League Division 1.

Group stage

Round of 16

External links
 Sanfrecce Hiroshima official site
 J. League official site

Sanfrecce Hiroshima
Sanfrecce Hiroshima seasons